Ramón "Chinggoy" Alonzo (July 22, 1950 – October 15, 2017) was a Filipino actor in theater, movies, and television. He was nominated for FAMAS Award Best Supporting Actor in Ikaw Naman ang Iiyak (1996).

Career
Alonzo was active in the theater industry since the 1960s as an actor and stage director, including work with repertory group The Company of Players.

He appeared in several films such as Dito Sa Pitong Gatang (1992), Sana Pag-ibig Na (1998), and Linlang (1999).

He played Don Ramón, the father of Dingdong Dantes' character in the drama series Sana ay Ikaw na Nga (2002), and the father of Iza Calzado's character in the 2006 film Moments of Love. He was known for portraying the character Evades in the fantasy series Encantadia. Recently, he also appeared in the historical epic series Indio (2013).

His last television appearance was in the revenge drama series Wildflower (2017), where he played the role of Senator Pablo Alcantara, the father of Roxanne Barcelo's character Natalie.

Personal life
His son Ralion Alonzo is also a Filipino actor now working in Hong Kong Disneyland playing multiple roles in Disney Revue and as a lead actor in Mulan, while his other son Shark Alonzo is a stage actor who played as Troy Bolton in High School Musical (2006) at the Ateneo de Manila University's Gonzaga Hall Fine Arts Theater.

Death
Alonzo died on October 15, 2017 from colon cancer. He was 67.

Filmography

Television

Film

References

External links

1950 births
2017 deaths
Male actors from Manila
Filipino male film actors
Filipino male television actors
GMA Network personalities
ABS-CBN personalities
Deaths from cancer in the Philippines
Deaths from colorectal cancer